Have Heart Have Money is the debut album by American rap group The Mossie, released August 26, 1997 on Sick Wid It and Jive Records. It was produced by DJ Xtra Large, K-Lou, Levitti, The Mossie, Rick Rock, Sean T, Studio Ton and Tone Capone and executive produced by B-Legit and E-40. The album peaked at number 35 on the Billboard Top Heatseekers and at number 62 on the Billboard Top R&B/Hip-Hop Albums. It features guest performances by E-40, 187 Fac, Celly Cel, Levitti, B-Legit, and G-Note of Funk Mobb.

Along with a single, a music video was released for the song, "Nobody Can Be You But You", featuring E-40 and cameo appearances by B-Legit, Celly Cel, D-Shot and Suga-T.

The song, "N.S.R." (Nutt Sak Rider), was originally released on the 1997 Sick Wid It Records compilation, Southwest Riders. Another song, "Show No Shame" was slightly altered and retitled from, "Get a Bar of This Game", when it first appeared on the Sick Wid It Records compilation, The Hogg in Me in 1995.

Track listing 
"This and That" (featuring Mr. Malik) – 4:24
"Gotta Get That Scrill" (featuring Suga-T) – 4:49
"Nobody Can Be You But You" (featuring E-40) – 3:48
"When I Say Jump" (featuring B-Legit) – 4:10
"N.S.R." (featuring Celly Cel) – 4:24
"Interlude #1 (Mama)" – 2:27
"Mama Used to Tell Me" (featuring Levitti) – 5:15
"White Girl for Sale" (featuring E-40 & Suga-T) – 4:14
"Interlude #2 (Cocktails)" – 0:58
"Later on at the Telly" – 4:07
"Players Roll" (featuring G-Note) – 4:37
"Strugglin'" (featuring Silk-E) – 4:30
"Show No Shame" – 4:46
"Black Ass" – 4:59
"Sick Wid It Shit" (featuring 187 Fac & Mistic) – 4:25

Chart history

Personnel 

 187 Fac - Performer
 B-Legit - Vocals, Background Vocals, Performer, Executive Producer
 Big Lurch - Background Vocals
 Celly Cel - Performer
 DJ Xtra Large - Producer, Engineer, Mixing
 E-Way - Bass, Guitar
 E-40 - Vocals, Background Vocals, Performer, Executive Producer
 G-Man Stan - Engineer, Mixing
 G-Note - Vocals
 Indo - Mixing
 K Lou - Keyboards, Vocals, Producer, Drum Programming, Mixing
 Kaveo - Vocals, Background Vocals
 Keba Konte - Photography
 Ken Lee - Mastering

 Levitti - Keyboards, Background Vocals, Producer, Performer, Drum Programming, Mixing
 Mr. Malik - Vocals, Background Vocals
 The Mossie - Vocals, Producer
 Pleasure - Background Vocals
 Rick Rock - Keyboards, Background Vocals, Producer, Engineer, Drum Programming, Mixing
 Sean T - Producer
 Studio Ton - Keyboards, Producer, Engineer, Drum Programming, Mixing
 Suga-T - Background Vocals, Performer
 Tap Dat Ass - Vocals, Background Vocals
 Tone Capone - Background Vocals, Producer, Engineer, Mixing
 Young Mugzi - Vocals, Background Vocals

References

External links 
[ Have Heart Have Money] at Allmusic
Have Heart Have Money at Discogs
Have Heart Have Money at Tower Records

1997 debut albums
Albums produced by Rick Rock
Albums produced by Studio Ton
The Mossie albums
Jive Records albums
Sick Wid It Records albums